Nemanja Majdov  (born 10 August 1996) is a Serbian judoka. He was born in Istočno Sarajevo, Bosnia and Herzegovina. He is coached by his father Ljubiša and his older brother Stefan, who is also a judoka.

He won a gold medal at the 2017 World Judo Championships in Budapest. At the 2018 European Judo Championships in Tel Aviv, he won his first senior European medal, a silver at the -90 kg category.

He won the silver medal in his event at the 2022 Judo Grand Slam Tel Aviv held in Tel Aviv, Israel.

Majdov will appear on the Together We Can Do Everything ballot list for the 2022 general election, as an independent candidate.

Honours
Young Athlete of The Year by the Serbian Olympic Committee: 2014

References

External links
 
 
 

1996 births
Living people
Serbian male judoka
World judo champions
Sportspeople from Sarajevo
Serbs of Bosnia and Herzegovina
Judoka at the 2014 Summer Youth Olympics
Mediterranean Games silver medalists for Serbia
Mediterranean Games medalists in judo
Competitors at the 2018 Mediterranean Games
European Games competitors for Serbia
Judoka at the 2015 European Games
Judoka at the 2019 European Games
Olympic judoka of Serbia
Judoka at the 2020 Summer Olympics